Manuela Goller (born 5 January 1971 in Wipperfürth, North Rhine-Westphalia) is a German former footballer.

Early life
Manuela Goller was born in Wipperfürth to Franz-Josef Goller, a dairy farmer, and joined the local sports club, TuS Egen, which he runs.

Career
Manuela Goller played as a goalkeeper for SSG 09 Bergisch Gladbach and Grün-Weiß Brauweiler. In 1997, playing for Brauweiler, she won the last German championship before the introduction of the national Bundesliga, beating FC Rumeln-Kaldenhausen 5–3 in a penalty shoot-out. In 1994 and 1997, she won the Frauen DFB Pokal. She played her first of 45 matches for Germany in 1990 against England. In 1995, she played in the final of the European Championship in 1995, which Germany won 3–2 against Sweden, and in the final of the World Cup in 1995, which Norway won 2–0. She also played all three games for Germany in the Summer Olympics in 1996. These were her last games for Germany.

References

1971 births
Living people
People from Wipperfürth
Sportspeople from Cologne (region)
German women's footballers
1995 FIFA Women's World Cup players
Footballers at the 1996 Summer Olympics
Germany women's international footballers
Women's association football goalkeepers
German footballers needing infoboxes
Olympic footballers of Germany
UEFA Women's Championship-winning players
Footballers from North Rhine-Westphalia